The men's 800 metres event at the 1993 Summer Universiade was held at the UB Stadium in Buffalo, United States 14–16 July 1993.

Medalists

Results

Heats

Semifinals

Final

References

Athletics at the 1993 Summer Universiade
1993